Juan of the Dead is a 2010 Spanish-Cuban zombie comedy film written and directed by Alejandro Brugués. in 2010. A Spanish-Cuban co-production between La Zanfoña Producciones (Spain) and Producciones de la 5ta Avenida (Cuba) involving the participation of the ICAIC, Canal Sur and Televisión Española, the film won the Goya Award for Best Spanish Language Foreign Film in 2012.

Plot

Juan (Alexis Díaz de Villegas) is forty years old and has devoted the majority of his life to living in Cuba doing absolutely nothing. He is accompanied by his bumbling sidekick, Lazaro (Jorge Molina), who is just as lazy but the bigger fool (and accident-prone), on a makeshift fishing raft. Their line snags what they think is a corpse but it suddenly awakens and attacks them, ending with Lazaro shooting it in the head with his spear gun. They think nothing of it at first and go about their business as usual, which involves thuggish activity and associating with their less than reputable friends: Lazaro's vain, Americanized pretty-boy son Vladi California; drag queen La China, who is also an expert slingshot marksman; and China's hulk-like lover Primo (who faints at the sight of blood and has to wear a blindfold when fighting).

The only emotional bond Juan has is with his daughter Camila (Andrea Duro), a young and beautiful girl who wants nothing to do with her father because the only thing he does is get in trouble. Suddenly a strange series of events begin to occur: people everywhere suddenly become violent and attack each other at random. After an encounter with an elderly neighbor's reanimated body, Juan comes to the conclusion that it is not vampires nor possession by demons, but capitalist dissidents. Lazaro attempts to flee with a woman he and the others have rescued, but Juan follows him to the raft they are trying to escape on. The woman falls into the water and is lost to them, leaving Lazaro with little reason to refuse Juan's plea for him to stay, and that Juan needs his sidekick.

To Camila's dismay, Juan's idea to take advantage of the situation is revealed: He starts a business, which he rationalizes will also be a great help for other survivors, with the slogan: "Juan of the Dead: we kill your beloved ones. How can we help you?" For a price, the five men in the group enter homes and slay the zombified residents. Although extremely proficient in dispatching their quarry in open streets, they suffer from bad luck and high civilian and resident casualties on indoor missions. That, coupled with allowing their corruption to come out (by looting and even attacking humans that Lazaro claims owe him money) puts strain both on his relationship with his daughter, and the success of their business.

The group is later rounded up by a shady military group, forcing them to strip naked and get into a truck. It seems they are recruiting able-bodied males to fight the zombie threat but some of the others who were rounded up before were infected, and they reanimate, causing a riot in the back of the truck and flipping it over, enabling Juan's group to flee, and further blunders on the military's part remove any hope they have of any kind of rescue or victory over the undead. China, who was bitten during the truck incident, dies and reanimates while handcuffed to Juan, and Vladi and Camila struggle to figure out a way to extricate Juan from his predicament. Juan finally throws China off the roof of their safe haven and Camila throws him some oil to lubricate zombie China's hand, letting him slip out of the cuffs and fall.

The zombies have become too numerous to continue the group's business operations, forcing them to stay on rooftops for safety, sending Vladi out on one-man food retrieval missions which endears him to Camila. At this point the group is whittled down to Juan, Lazaro, Primo, Vladi, and Camila, the latter two having become romantically involved despite Juan's disapproval. Losing hope, they decide to try heading for the mountains which may be unpopulated and safer. An escape attempt via motor vehicle is thwarted by mechanical failure (and the fact that none of them knows how to drive), forcing them to flee on foot while pursued by hundreds of undead. Attempting to seek shelter in a bunker, yet another of Juan's ideas proves disastrous, as Primo, while prying open the door, reveals it is overrun and he is pulled in.

The remaining group makes their way to a basketball court where a miraculous feat of vehicular zombie-slaying by a middle-aged white man with a harpoon gun mounted on his truck saves them after they become surrounded. He tries to tell the group what he knows about the situation in English, but the language barrier between them prevents him from divulging his plan to end the disaster, which he believes has religious implications. He is then accidentally killed by another of Lazaro's spear gun incidents, forcing the desperate group to come up with yet another plan for escape, and berating Lazaro for his continual screw-ups.

Sheltering in a deserted parking garage the man had led them to, Lazaro amazingly comes up with a plan to make up for his repeated failures. According to his idea, they construct a flotation mechanism out of empty oil drums and attach them to a convertible, with the intention of attempting to drive through a group of zombies on the street and out onto the beach, where they can reach the water. They plan to float to Florida (where Camila's mother is known to be staying), hoping America might be safer. Lazaro confides to Juan that he had been bitten during their earlier escape, and they share an emotional goodbye while they wait for him to change, until it's revealed it was only a harmless scratch.

Juan and Lazaro fight the zombies standing in their way to clear a path to the water for the car to drive over. Juan hears a child's crying and goes to investigate. He rescues a little boy from his zombified father and brings him to the car. Lazaro and Juan create a ramp of bodies for the car to jump over the wall separating the street from the sand, and the car makes it into the water. Preparing to float to freedom, the group is shocked when Juan gets out of the floating car and heads back to shore, explaining to his comrades that he belongs in his homeland and convincing them that he's going to do what he's always done best: Survive.

The end credits are an animated cartoon showing Juan going through the horde of zombies. It is later shown that Camila, Lazaro and Vladi came back to join Juan in fighting the dead.

Cast
 Alexis Díaz de Villegas as Juan
 Jorge Molina as Lazaro
 Andrea Duro as Camila
 Andros Perugorría as Vladi California
 Jazz Vilá as La China
 Eliecer Ramírez as El Primo
 Antonio Dechent as Father Jones
 Blanca Rosa Blanco as Sara
 Elsa Camp as Yiya
 Susana Pous as Lucía
 Eslinda Núñez as Leader of CDR Meeting
 Juan Miguel Mas as President of the CDR
 Manuel Herrera as TV Announcer
 Luis Alberto García as Padre

Release
The film was first shown at the 2011 Toronto International Film Festival. Focus Features released the film on 14 August via iVOD and VOD, along with DVD and Blu-ray Disc.

Reception
Total Film gave the film three stars out of five, noting the film's "jaunty tone bristling uneasily with often unlikeable heroes" but praised its political context, stating that the film "resurrects the genre's political subtexts with jibes at a country where zombies are dismissed as 'dissidents' and public transport continues to run, no matter what."

As of October 2020, the film has 83% on Rotten Tomatoes based on  23 reviews. The site's critics consensus reads, "Filled with wild splatter slapstick, Juan of the Dead also deftly uses its zombie premise as an undead Trojan horse for insightful political commentary."

References

External links
 

2011 films
2011 horror films
2011 comedy films
2010s comedy horror films
Cuban speculative fiction films
Films critical of communism
Spanish horror films
2010s Spanish-language films
Parodies of horror
Political satire films
Zombie comedy films
2010s Spanish films